Philip John Rogers (born 24 April 1971) is a former breaststroke swimmer who competed in three consecutive Summer Olympics for Australia, starting in 1992.  He was an Australian Institute of Sport scholarship holder.

At his Olympic debut he won the bronze medal in the 100-metre breaststroke, followed by a bronze in 1996 in the 4x100-metre medley relay.  During his last Olympic appearance, at the 2000 Summer Olympics in Sydney, he was the oldest member of the Australian Swimming team, at age 29.

See also
 List of Commonwealth Games medallists in swimming (men)
 List of Olympic medalists in swimming (men)
 World record progression 100 metres breaststroke
 World record progression 200 metres breaststroke

References

1971 births
Living people
Australian male breaststroke swimmers
Sportspeople from Adelaide
Olympic swimmers of Australia
Swimmers at the 1992 Summer Olympics
Swimmers at the 1996 Summer Olympics
Swimmers at the 2000 Summer Olympics
Olympic bronze medalists for Australia
Commonwealth Games silver medallists for Australia
Commonwealth Games gold medallists for Australia
Australian Institute of Sport swimmers
World record setters in swimming
Olympic bronze medalists in swimming
World Aquatics Championships medalists in swimming
Medalists at the FINA World Swimming Championships (25 m)
Medalists at the 1996 Summer Olympics
Medalists at the 1992 Summer Olympics
Commonwealth Games bronze medallists for Australia
Swimmers at the 1990 Commonwealth Games
Swimmers at the 1994 Commonwealth Games
Swimmers at the 1998 Commonwealth Games
Commonwealth Games medallists in swimming
20th-century Australian people
Medallists at the 1990 Commonwealth Games
Medallists at the 1994 Commonwealth Games
Medallists at the 1998 Commonwealth Games